Metampicillin (INN) is a penicillin antibiotic. It is prepared by the reaction of ampicillin with formaldehyde, and is hydrolysed in aqueous solution with the formation of ampicillin. Hydrolysis is rapid under acid conditions, e.g., in the stomach, less rapid in neutral media, and incomplete in solutions such as human serum.

References

External links 
 ChEBI ID

Penicillins